Irv Gotti Presents: The Inc. is the second compilation album by Murder Inc. Records. It was released on July 2, 2002 through The Island Def Jam Music Group and Irv Gotti's Murder Inc. Records. Production was primarily handled by Irv Gotti (who also executive produced the album), as well as Chink Santana, 7 Aurelius, DL and Buck 3000. It featured contributions from Murder Inc. roster, such as Caddillac Tah, Black Child, Ja Rule, Ashanti, Charli Baltimore and Vita, and guest appearances from Jennifer Lopez, Eastwood and Crooked I.

The album spawned two singles: "Ain't It Funny (Murder Remix)" and "Down 4 U", both made it to the Billboard Hot 100 peaking at number one and six, respectively. The album debuted at number three on the Billboard 200 and number two on the Top R&B/Hip-Hop Albums with 193,000 copies sold in the first week, and was certified Gold by the Recording Industry Association of America on August 14, 2002 with sales of over 500,000 copies in the United States.

Track listing

Charts

Weekly charts

Year-end charts

Certifications

References

External links

2002 compilation albums
East Coast hip hop compilation albums
Albums produced by Irv Gotti
Gangsta rap compilation albums
Albums produced by Chink Santana
Def Jam Recordings compilation albums